Gunshy is an American 1998 crime drama film directed by Jeff Celentano and starring William Petersen, Michael Wincott, and Diane Lane.

Plot
When New York journalist Jake Bridges catches his girlfriend cheating on him, he travels to Atlantic City to drink away his troubles. Jake is saved from a bar brawl by small-time mobster Frankie. Jake befriends Frankie and eventually falls in love with his girlfriend Melissa. Jake then joins Frankie in his money-collecting duties, beginning a path leading to violence, betrayal, and restitution.

Cast

External links 

1998 films
1998 crime drama films
1990s American films
1990s English-language films
American crime drama films
Films directed by Jeff Celentano
Films shot in New Jersey